The Lord of Kintyre is a title in the Peerage of Scotland for Kintyre, which was created in 1626.

Early lords of Kintyre
Somhairle mac Giolla Brighde (died 1164)
Raghnall mac Somhairle (died 1191/1192–c.1210/1227)
Ruaidhrí mac Raghnaill (died 1247?)
Maol Coluim (died 1307?)

Lord of Kintyre
Archibald Campbell, 7th Earl of Argyll, 1st Lord of Kintyre (1626–1638).
Archibald Campbell, 1st Marquess of Argyll, 2nd Lord of Kintyre (1645–1661).
Archibald Campbell, 9th Earl of Argyll, 3rd Lord of Kintyre (1663–1685).
Archibald Campbell, 1st Duke of Argyll, 4th Lord of Kintyre (1689–1703).
John Campbell, 2nd Duke of Argyll, 5th Lord of Kintyre (1703–1743).
Archibald Campbell, 3rd Duke of Argyll, 6th Lord of Kintyre (1743–1761).
John Campbell, 4th Duke of Argyll, 7th Lord of Kintyre (1761–1770).
John Campbell, 5th Duke of Argyll, 8th Lord of Kintyre (1770–1806).
George Campbell, 6th Duke of Argyll, 9th Lord of Kintyre (1806–1839).
John Campbell, 7th Duke of Argyll, 10th Lord of Kintyre (1839–1847).
George Campbell, 8th Duke of Argyll, 11th Lord of Kintyre (1847–1900).
John Campbell, 9th Duke of Argyll, 12th Lord of Kintyre (1900–1914).
Niall Campbell, 10th Duke of Argyll, 13th Lord of Kintyre (1914–1949).
Ian Campbell, 11th Duke of Argyll, 14th Lord of Kintyre (1949–1973).
Ian Campbell, 12th Duke of Argyll, 15th Lord of Kintyre (1973–2001).
Torquhil Campbell, 13th Duke of Argyll, 16th Lord of Kintyre (2001–present).

Clan Campbell
Clann Ruaidhrí
Clann Somhairle
Kintyre
Kintyre
Kintyre